Marko Nikolić (Serbian Cyrillic: Марко Николић ; born 27 August 1989) is a Serbian football midfielder.

Nikolić was born in Belgrade, and plays for Kolonija Kovin on loan from Smederevo.

External links
 

1989 births
Living people
Footballers from Belgrade
Serbian footballers
FK Smederevo players
Serbian SuperLiga players
Association football midfielders